Union Congregational Church may refer to:

 Union Congregational Church (Avon Park, Florida)
 Union Congregational Church (Tavares, Florida)
Union Park Congregational Church and Carpenter Chapel, Chicago, Illinois, listed on the National Register of Historic Places in Chicago, Illinois
 Union Congregational Church (Taunton, Massachusetts), listed on the NRHP in Massachusetts
Union Congregational Church (Worcester, Massachusetts), listed on the NRHP in Massachusetts
Union Congregational Church (Mackinac Island, Michigan), listed as a Michigan State Historic Site
Union Valley Congregational Church, Taylor, New York, listed on the NRHP in New York
Union Congregational Church and Parsonage (Buffalo, Wyoming), listed on the NRHP in Johnson County, Wyoming